The Pale Light of Sorrow is a 1981 Romanian drama film directed by Iulian Mihu. It was entered into the 12th Moscow International Film Festival where it won a Special Diploma.

Cast
 Violeta Andrei
 Andrei Finti
 Florina Luican
 Gheorghe Marin
 Rodica Muresan
 Emanoil Petrut
 Alexandru Racoviceanu
 Geo Saizescu
 Siegfried Siegmund
 Savel Stiopul
 Liliana Tudor

References

External links
 

1981 films
1981 drama films
1980s Romanian-language films
1980s war films
Romanian historical films
Romanian drama films
Romanian World War I films